Twenty something or twentysomething may refer to:

Twentysomething (term), a person in the age group of 20 to 29
Twentysomething (album), by Jamie Cullum
"Twenty-something", a 2016 single by Pet Shop Boys from the album Super
Twenty Something (1994 film), a Hong Kong Film directed by Teddy Chan
Twenty Something (2021 film), a 2D short film by Pixar Animation Studios
Twentysomething (TV series), an Australian television series
Twenty Something, a Pan Arab television show about local arts and culture, broadcast weekly on Dubai One starting January 17, 2010
Twenty-Something, an alias used by electronic music producers Geert Huinink and Alco Lammers
"20 Something", a song by Dala from the album Angels & Thieves